The Perfect General is a computer wargame published in 1991 by Quantum Quality Productions.

Publication
The game was designed by Peter Zaccagnino and published in 1991 for the Amiga and DOS. A sequel, The Perfect General II, was released in 1994. The original game was modified for the 3DO by Game Guild in 1996 and published by Kirin Entertainment. The 3DO version includes a few scenarios which are absent from the personal computer versions. A refurbished version is available for Windows since 2003.

The rights for the original version were purchased by Mark Kinkead in 2002, and later released in 2003 as "The Perfect General Internet Edition" by Killer Bee Software. As the name suggests, this version can be played via Internet.

Gameplay
The game is a turn-based map-oriented military simulation game. Along with Modem Wars and Populous, it was one of the early games offering an online mode for real-time-matches via telecommunication networks. The original online-game was played via modem or null modem serial connection.

Reception
The Perfect General sold 75,000 copies by June 1993. Computer Gaming World in 1992 described The Perfect General as "a wonderful game system with a mediocre AI and great two-player potential", and later named it the best wargame of the year. A 1993 survey in the magazine of wargames gave the game three-plus stars out of five, stating that it "sacrifices realism for playability". A 1994 survey gave the Greatest Battles of the 20th Century two-plus stars out of five, noting the game's ease of use and "enjoyable", but inaccurate, scenarios.

In 1996, Computer Gaming World declared The Perfect General the 107th-best computer game ever released. The magazine's wargame columnist Terry Coleman named it his pick for the 12th-best computer wargame released by late 1996.

Reviews
 Casus Belli #71 (Sep 1992)

References

External links
Killer Bee Software: The Perfect General Internet Edition

1991 video games
3DO Interactive Multiplayer games
Amiga games
Computer wargames
DOS games
Multiplayer and single-player video games
Online games
Quantum Quality Productions games
Ubisoft games
Video games developed in the United States